George Gorton (March 30, 1947 - May 11, 2022) was an American Republican Party political consultant from California. He helped lead national political campaigns in Russia, Panama, Romania, Czechoslovakia, Canada and the United States.

His involvement in Boris Yeltsin's reelection campaign, along with his partners Joe Shumate and Dick Dresner, was the subject of a ten-page cover story in Time magazine, and a major motion picture (Spinning Boris) where George, the central figure in the movie, is played by Jeff Goldblum.

Gorton served on the national campaign teams of Presidents Richard Nixon, Gerald Ford, and Ronald Reagan. He managed all of Governor Pete Wilson's successful gubernatorial and US Senate races. He was the first political consultant hired by Arnold Schwarzenegger in 2000 and was the chief strategist for his campaign for governor in 2003.

References

American political consultants
1947 births
California Republicans